The 2002 Tunbridge Wells Council election took place on 2 May 2002 to elect members of Tunbridge Wells Borough Council in Kent, England. The whole council was up for election with boundary changes since the last election in 2000. The Conservative Party stayed in overall control of the council.

Results
The results saw the Conservatives increase their majority, while the Labour group leader lost his seat.

By ward

References

2002 English local elections
2002
2000s in Kent